Sylvan Township is a civil township of Washtenaw County in the U.S. state of Michigan. The population was 2,833 at the 2010 census. The population was a large decrease from 6,425 at the 2000 census, which was due to Chelsea incorporating into a city in 2004.

Commmunities
 Kavanaugh Lake is a former community that existed within the township.  It very briefly had a rural post office from February 13, 1893 until January 6, 1894.  The lake itself is spelled differently as Cavanaugh Lake within the northwest section of the township.
 Pierceville is a former settlement that was first settled in 1834.  It was named after Nathan Pierce, who became the township's first supervisor when Sylvan Township was organized that same year.  A post office operated in Pierceville from May 2, 1835 until January 8, 1841.  It was bypassed by future railroad development, and the community was eventually abandoned.
A post office opened under the name Sylvan on July 8, 1834. The township itself was established around the same time and so named after the wife of early settler Edmund Conkling. The new community was named Sylvan Center due to its central location within the new township. The post office operated until August 31, 1892. It was restored from March 3, 1893 until June 14, 1902.

Geography

Portions of the Waterloo State Recreation Area are located in the northwest section of the township.  The Goose Lake State Game Area is located in the southwest corner of the township.  The Border-to-Border Trail runs very briefly through the township just north of the city of Chelsea.

Major highways
 runs east–west through the center of the township.
 runs south–north along the eastern edge of the township and has a junction with Interstate 94 before entering Chelsea

Demographics
As of the census of 2000, there were 6,425 people, 2,500 households, and 1,700 families residing in the township. The racial makeup of the township was 97.17% White, 0.67% African American, 0.31% Native American, 0.51% Asian, 0.05% Pacific Islander, 0.26% from other races, and 1.03% from two or more races. Hispanic or Latino of any race were 1.28% of the population.

There were 2,500 households, out of which 33.0% had children under the age of 18 living with them, 56.7% were married couples living together, 8.9% had a female householder with no husband present, and 32.0% were non-families. 28.9% of all households were made up of individuals, and 15.3% had someone living alone who was 65 years of age or older.  The average household size was 2.45 and the average family size was 3.03.

In the township the population was spread out, with 24.7% under the age of 18, 6.0% from 18 to 24, 26.1% from 25 to 44, 24.8% from 45 to 64, and 18.4% who were 65 years of age or older.  The median age was 41 years. For every 100 females, there were 91.0 males.  For every 100 females age 18 and over, there were 84.6 males.

The median income for a household in the township was $56,519, and the median income for a family was $73,450. Males had a median income of $51,424 versus $35,409 for females. The per capita income for the township was $28,781.  About 2.1% of families and 3.0% of the population were below the poverty line, including 2.0% of those under age 18 and 4.6% of those age 65 or over.

Education
Sylvan Township is served entirely by Chelsea School District.

Images

References

Sources

External links

Sylvan Township official website

Townships in Washtenaw County, Michigan
Townships in Michigan
1834 establishments in Michigan Territory
Populated places established in 1834